The Al-Faruq Mosque may refer to:

 Al-Faruq Mosque (Denmark) in Copenhagen, Denmark
 Al-Faruq Mosque (Puerto Rico) in Vega Alta, Puerto Rico